The Parliamentary Elections (Returns) Act 1695 (7 & 8 Will 3 c 7) was an Act of the Parliament of England.

The provisions as to procuring returns in sections 3 and 4 ceased to have effect by virtue of section 74(5) of, and Schedule 11 to, the Representation of the People Act 1948.

The whole Act except section 5 was, and in section 5 the words "and for the more easy and better proof of any such false or double return" and the words from "and that the party" to the end of the section were, repealed by section 80(7) of, and Schedule 13 to, the Representation of the People Act 1948.

The whole Act was repealed by section 175(1) of, and Schedule 9 to, the Representation of the People Act 1949.

The whole Act was repealed for the Republic of Ireland by section 3 of, and Schedule 1 to, the Electoral Act 1963.

References
Halsbury's Statutes,

External links
Text of the Act
List of repeals in the Republic of Ireland from the Irish Statute Book

Acts of the Parliament of England
1695 in law
1695 in England
Election law in the United Kingdom
Election legislation